Nancy Kilpatrick is a Canadian author who has written stories in the genres of dark fantasy, horror, mystery, erotic horror, and gothic subculture.

She is most known for her vampire themed works.

Awards 

She is the recipient of the Arthur Ellis Award. Fangoria called her "Canada's answer to Anne Rice".

Personal life 

She lives and works in Montreal. She also teaches Short Story Writing at George Brown College.

References

External links

1946 births
Living people
American expatriate writers in Canada
Canadian horror writers
Women horror writers
21st-century Canadian women writers
20th-century Canadian women writers
Dark fantasy writers
Erotic horror writers
Writers from Montreal
Academic staff of George Brown College